Decazyx is a genus of flowering plants belonging to the family Rutaceae.

Its native range is Mexico to Central America.

Species:

Decazyx esparzae 
Decazyx macrophyllus

References

Zanthoxyloideae
Zanthoxyloideae genera